The Queen Maria II National Theatre is a theatre in Lisbon, Portugal. The historic theatre is one of the most prestigious Portuguese venues and is located in the Rossio square, in the centre of the city.

History 

The theatre was built on the north side of Rossio square on the site of the old Estaus Palace, built around 1450 as a lodging for foreign dignitaries and noblemen visiting Lisbon. In the 16th century, when the Inquisition was installed in Portugal, the Estaus Palace became the seat of the Inquisition. The palace survived the 1755 Lisbon earthquake, but was destroyed by fire in 1836.

Thanks to the intensive efforts of Romantic poet and dramatist Almeida Garrett, it was decided to replace the old palace by a modern theatre, dedicated to Queen Mary II of Portugal. The building was constructed between 1842 and 1846 to a Neoclassical design by Italian architect Fortunato Lodi.

The Theatre building was as a Property of Public Interest in 1928, and has been reclassified as National Monument since 2003.

Architecture 
The building is the best representative of Neoclassical architecture of Palladian influence in Lisbon. The main feature of the façade is a portico (hexastyle) with six Ionic columns reused from the Saint Francis Convent of Lisbon and a triangular pediment. The tympanum of the pediment is decorated with a sculpted relief showing Apollo and the Muses.

The pediment is topped by a statue of Renaissance playwright Gil Vicente (c. 1464-c. 1536), considered the founder of Portuguese theatre. Ironically, some of Gil Vicente's plays had been censured by the Portuguese Inquisition in the late 16th century.

The interior of the theatre was decorated by many important 19th-century Portuguese artists, but much of this decoration was lost in a fire in 1964. The theatre had to be completely renovated and was reinaugurated only in 1978.

See also
List of theatres and auditoriums in Lisbon

References

External links

 
 General Bureau for National Buildings and Monuments (in Portuguese)

Neoclassical architecture in Portugal
Dona Maria, National Theatre D. Maria II
Dona Maria, National Theatre D. Maria II
National monuments in Lisbon District